Julissa Reynoso Pantaleón (born January 2, 1975) is a Dominican-American attorney and diplomat who is the United States Ambassador to Spain and Andorra. Most recently, she was the chief of staff to First Lady Jill Biden. She formerly served as a litigation and international arbitration partner with the international law firm Winston & Strawn LLP. She was previously a partner with Chadbourne & Parke LLP, practicing in the firm's International Arbitration and Latin America groups. Reynoso is also affiliated with the faculty at Columbia University School of Law and the School of International and Public Affairs. From March 2012 until December 2014, she served as United States Ambassador to Uruguay. She is a former deputy assistant secretary for the Bureau of Western Hemisphere Affairs at the United States Department of State. President Biden nominated her to be the next United States Ambassador to Spain on July 27, 2021, being confirmed on December 18, 2021.

Early life and education
A native of the Dominican Republic, Reynoso immigrated to the United States in 1982. She graduated valedictorian of her class at Aquinas High School in the Bronx. She was admitted to Harvard University, where she helped found several student groups and was active with the Institute of Politics at the John F. Kennedy School of Government.

After earning an A.B. in government from Harvard University in 1997, Reynoso was named the John Harvard Scholar and earned a Master of Philosophy in development studies in 1998 from Emmanuel College, Cambridge. Reynoso also earned a Juris Doctor from Columbia Law School in 2001. At Columbia, she was the editor for the Columbia Journal of Transnational Law. Her graduate studies were supported by The Paul & Daisy Soros Fellowships for New Americans. After law school, she clerked for Judge Laura Taylor Swain.

Career
In 2008, Reynoso was active in the Hillary Clinton 2008 presidential campaign before joining the Barack Obama 2008 presidential campaign.

Prior to joining the Obama administration, Reynoso was an attorney in private practice at the international law firm of Simpson Thacher & Bartlett LLP in New York. Reynoso resided in the Washington Heights neighborhood in Manhattan and served on the boards of several non-profit groups. She also served as a legal fellow at Columbia Law School and the Institute for Policy Integrity at New York University School of Law.

In 2006, Reynoso served as deputy director of the Office of Accountability in the New York City Department of Education. Reynoso has published widely in both Spanish and English on a range of issues including regulatory reform, community organizing, housing reform, immigration policy and Latin American politics for both popular press and academic journals.

Reynoso is a member of the Council of Foreign Relations and a World Economic Forum Young Global Leader. Reynoso is the recipient of various public interest awards, including recognitions from Columbia University, New York University, the NorthStar Foundation, the Legal Aid Society, and the Hispanic National Bar Foundation. She serves on the boards of several nonprofit and advocacy organizations. She is also a member of a Washington, D.C.–based Western Hemisphere think tank, the Inter-American Dialogue.

Obama administration

Department of State
In 2009, Reynoso joined former secretary of state Hillary Clinton to serve as Deputy Assistant Secretary in the Bureau of Western Hemisphere Affairs. During her tenure, Reynoso was charged with developing and implementing a comprehensive security and rule of Law strategy for Central America and the Caribbean.

Ambassador to Uruguay
In October 2011, President Barack Obama expressed his intention to nominate Reynoso as United States Ambassador to Uruguay. On March 30, 2012, the U.S. Senate confirmed Reynoso as United States ambassador to Uruguay. As an ambassador, Reynoso focused on trade and commerce, with particular interest in agricultural trade, and on science, technology and education cooperation.

Tenure
In 2014, during her time as Ambassador to Uruguay, Reynoso was allegedly denied entry into a restaurant in Montevideo because of racial discrimination, though they initially claimed it was due to lack of reservation and dress code despite others entering without a reservation. Uruguayan media called it a "diplomatic mess" and the restaurant apologized, claiming the host incorrectly discerned who could enter. Reynoso escalated this incident with the State Department.

Biden administration

Chief of Staff to the First Lady
In November 2020, Reynoso was named chief of staff to the then-incoming First Lady of the United States, Jill Biden.

Ambassador to Spain
On July 27, 2021, President Joe Biden announced the nomination of Reynoso to be the United States ambassador to Spain and Andorra. Her nomination was sent to the Senate the following day. Hearings on her nomination were held before the Senate's Foreign Relations Committee on October 5, 2021. Her nomination was reported favorably by the committee on November 3, 2021. On December 18, 2021, her nomination was confirmed in the Senate by voice vote. Reynoso arrived in Spain on January 17, 2022. On February 2, 2022, she presented her credentials to King Felipe VI.

Recognition 
Reynoso was recognized in Crain's New Yorks 2017 "List of Leading Women Lawyers in NYC".

She and her colleague Nicole Silver were recognized in Latinvex's 2017 ranking of "Latin America's Top 100 Female Lawyers."

In 2017, Winston & Strawn was ranked as an international firm for its Latin America practice, of which Reynoso is a member, in the international arbitration category.

References

External links

Julissa Reynoso Pantaleón's profile from the Biden-Harris transition website

|-

1975 births
Living people
21st-century American women
Alumni of Emmanuel College, Cambridge
Ambassadors of the United States to Andorra
Ambassadors of the United States to Spain
Ambassadors of the United States to Uruguay
American women ambassadors
Biden administration personnel
Columbia Law School alumni
Dominican Republic emigrants to the United States
Harvard University alumni
Hispanic and Latino American diplomats
Members of the Inter-American Dialogue
New York (state) Democrats
New York (state) lawyers
People associated with Winston & Strawn
Simpson Thacher & Bartlett
United States Department of State officials
American women diplomats